John Anthony Moraga (born March 20, 1984) is an American professional boxer and mixed martial artist who competes as a flyweight and featherweight in MMA and boxing, respectively. He is best known for his lengthy career Ultimate Fighting Championship which saw him challenge for the UFC Flyweight Championship in 2013.

Background
Moraga was born and raised in Phoenix, Arizona. He attended Maryvale High School and then chose to go to Arizona State University where he was a two-time University Freestyle All-American wrestler for the Sun Devils.

Mixed martial arts career
Moraga started his professional career at 2009 in Arizona for the local organization Rage in the Cage. There he achieved an undefeated record of 6–0, until his fight against John Dodson at 2010, in which he lost via unanimous decision. After this setback he won five straight bouts to make his way into the UFC. He is of Mexican heritage.

Ultimate Fighting Championship
Moraga was expected his promotional debut against Ian McCall on August 4, 2012 at UFC on Fox 4. However, McCall was forced out of the bout with an injury and replaced by Ulysses Gomez. Moraga won the fight via KO in the first round.

Moraga next faced Chris Cariaso on December 29, 2012 at UFC 155. Moraga was victorious with a third round guillotine choke submission. His victory also earned him Submission of the Night honors.

Moraga was expected to face Demetrious Johnson for the UFC Flyweight Championship on April 13, 2013 at The Ultimate Fighter 17 Finale.  However, Johnson was forced out of the bout with an injury and Moraga was removed from the event as well.

Moraga eventually faced Demetrious Johnson at UFC on Fox 8 on July 27, 2013. Moraga showed promise in the first round as he landed some good strikes standing. However, the champion began to wear him down with his wrestling. Despite hurting Johnson in the fourth round with a punch, he lost the fight via submission in the fifth round.

Moraga was expected to face Darren Uyenoyama on December 14, 2013 at UFC on Fox 9.  However, Moraga pulled out of the bout with an undisclosed injury and was replaced by promotional newcomer Alptekin Ozkilic.

Moraga faced Dustin Ortiz on January 15, 2014 at UFC Fight Night 35. He won the fight via split decision.

A rematch with John Dodson took place on June 7, 2014 at UFC Fight Night 42. He lost the fight via TKO due to a doctor stoppage between rounds two and three after a knee Dodson threw late in the second round broke Moraga's nose.

Moraga faced Justin Scoggins on September 5, 2014 at UFC Fight Night 50.  Moraga defeated Scoggins via submission in the second round, securing a guillotine choke after being taken down.

Moraga was expected to face Jussier Formiga on December 13, 2014 at UFC on Fox 13.  However, Formiga pulled out of the fight on November 21 and was replaced by Willie Gates. Moraga won the fight via submission in the third round.

Moraga faced Joseph Benavidez on May 23, 2015 at UFC 187.  Moraga lost the back and forth fight via unanimous decision.

Moraga faced Matheus Nicolau on July 8, 2016 at The Ultimate Fighter 23 Finale He lost the fight via split decision.

Moraga was expected to face Zach Makovsky on December 10, 2016 at UFC 206. However, Moraga pulled out of the fight in early November citing injury and was replaced by Dustin Ortiz.

Moraga next faced Sergio Pettis on January 15, 2017 at UFC Fight Night 103. He lost the fight via unanimous decision.

Moraga faced promotional newcomer Ashkan Mokhtarian on June 11, 2017 at UFC Fight Night 110. He won the one-sided fight by unanimous decision.

Moraga faced Magomed Bibulatov on October 7, 2017 at UFC 216. He won the fight via knockout in the first round. This win earned him the Performance of the Night award.

Moraga faced Wilson Reis on April 14, 2018 at UFC on Fox 29. He won the fight via unanimous decision.

Moraga faced Deiveson Figueiredo on August 25, 2018 at UFC Fight Night 135. He lost the fight via TKO in the second round.

On February 7, 2019, it was reported that Moraga was released from the UFC.

Post-UFC career
Moraga was supposed to face Hector Sandoval at ARES 2 on April 3, 2020. However, due to the COVID-19 pandemic, the event was postponed until October 30, 2020, before being cancelled altogether.

Professional boxing career
Just before joining ranks of the UFC, Moraga made his professional boxing debut against Jose Marrufo, losing the bout via unanimous decision.

After he was released from the UFC in 2019, he continued with his boxing career by defeating Brandon Foss via technical knockout in the second round.

Championships and accomplishments

Amateur wrestling 
USA Wrestling
University Freestyle All-American out of Arizona State University (2006–07)
University Freestyle National Championship 133 lb: 6th place out of Arizona State University (2006–07)
National Collegiate Athletic Association
Pac-10 Conference 125 lb: 4th place out of Arizona State University (2007)
Pac-10 Conference 133 lb: 6th place out of Arizona State University (2004)

Mixed martial arts 
Ultimate Fighting Championship
Submission of the Night (one time)
Performance of the Night (one time)
Rage in the Cage
Rage in the Cage Bantamweight Crown (2012)
Trilogy Championship Fighting
Trilogy Championship Fighting Bantamweight Champion (2011)
Sherdog
 2013 All-Violence First Team

Mixed martial arts record

|-
|Loss
|align=center|19–7
|Deiveson Figueiredo
|TKO (punches)
|UFC Fight Night: Gaethje vs. Vick 
|
|align=center|2
|align=center|3:08
|Lincoln, Nebraska, United States
|
|-
|Win
|align=center|19-6
|Wilson Reis
|Decision (unanimous)
|UFC on Fox: Poirier vs. Gaethje
|
|align=center|3
|align=center|5:00
|Glendale, Arizona, United States
|
|-
|Win
|align=center|18–6
|Magomed Bibulatov
|KO (punch)
|UFC 216 
|
|align=center|1
|align=center|1:38
|Las Vegas, Nevada, United States
|
|-
|Win
|align=center|17–6
|Ashkan Mokhtarian
|Decision (unanimous)
|UFC Fight Night: Lewis vs. Hunt
|
|align=center|3
|align=center|5:00
|Auckland, New Zealand
|
|-
|Loss
|align=center|16–6
|Sergio Pettis
|Decision (unanimous)
|UFC Fight Night: Rodríguez vs. Penn
|
|align=center|3
|align=center|5:00
|Phoenix, Arizona, United States
|
|-
|Loss
|align=center|16–5
|Matheus Nicolau
|Decision (split)
|The Ultimate Fighter: Team Joanna vs. Team Cláudia Finale
|
|align=center|3
|align=center|5:00
|Las Vegas, Nevada, United States
|
|-
|Loss
|align=center|16–4
|Joseph Benavidez
|Decision (unanimous)
|UFC 187
|
|align=center|3
|align=center|5:00
|Las Vegas, Nevada, United States
|
|-
|Win
|align=center| 16–3
|Willie Gates
|Submission (rear-naked choke)
|UFC on Fox: dos Santos vs. Miocic
|
|align=center|3
|align=center|4:06
|Phoenix, Arizona, United States
|
|-
|Win
|align=center|15–3
|Justin Scoggins
|Submission (guillotine choke)
|UFC Fight Night: Jacare vs. Mousasi
|
|align=center|2
|align=center|0:47
|Mashantucket, Connecticut, United States
|
|-
|Loss
|align=center|14–3
| John Dodson
|TKO (doctor stoppage)
|UFC Fight Night: Henderson vs. Khabilov
|
|align=center|2
|align=center|5:00
|Albuquerque, New Mexico, United States
|
|-
|Win
|align=center|14–2
| Dustin Ortiz
|Decision (split)
|UFC Fight Night: Rockhold vs. Philippou
|
|align=center|3
|align=center|5:00
|Duluth, Georgia, United States
|
|-
|Loss
|align=center|13–2
| Demetrious Johnson
|Submission (armbar)
|UFC on Fox: Johnson vs. Moraga
|
|align=center|5
|align=center|3:43
|Seattle, Washington, United States
|
|-
|Win
|align=center|13–1
| Chris Cariaso
|Submission (guillotine choke)
|UFC 155
|
|align=center|3
|align=center|1:11
|Las Vegas, Nevada, United States
|
|-
|Win
|align=center|12–1
| Ulysses Gomez
|KO (elbows and punches)
|UFC on Fox: Shogun vs. Vera
|
|align=center|1
|align=center|3:46
|Los Angeles, California, United States
|
|-
|Win
|align=center|11–1
| Jose Carbajal
|Decision (unanimous)
|Cage Rage: On the River 2
|
|align=center|3
|align=center|5:00
|Parker, Arizona, United States
|
|-
|Win
|align=center|10–1
| Maurice Senters
|Decision (unanimous)
|Rage in the Cage 160
|
|align=center|3
|align=center|5:00
|Chandler, Arizona, United States
|
|-
|Win
|align=center|9–1
| Matthew Garcia
|Submission (armbar)
|Coalition of Combat: The Bangers Ball
|
|align=center|1
|align=center|3:10
|Phoenix, Arizona, United States
|
|-
|Win
|align=center|8–1
| Freddie Lux
|Submission (guillotine choke)
|Trilogy Championship Fighting: Rumble at the Ranch 2
|
|align=center|1
|align=center|0:49
|Phoenix, Arizona, United States
|
|-
|Win
|align=center|7–1
| Nathaniel Baker
|Submission (armbar)
|Martinez Brothers Production: Sun City Battle
|
|align=center|3
|align=center|2:27
|El Paso, Texas, United States
|
|-
|Loss
|align=center|6–1
| John Dodson
|Decision (unanimous)
|Nemesis Fighting: MMA Global Invasion
|
|align=center|3
|align=center|5:00
|Punta Cana, Dominican Republic
|
|-
|Win
|align=center|6–0
|  Aldo Escudero
|Decision (unanimous)
|Rage in the Cage 143
|
|align=center|3
|align=center|5:00
|Phoenix, Arizona, United States
|
|-
|Win
|align=center|5–0
| Travis Halverson
|Submission (guillotine choke)
|Rage in the Cage 142
|
|align=center|1
|align=center|1:17
|Chandler, Arizona, United States
|
|-
|Win
|align=center|4–0
|Pat Donovan
|Submission (triangle choke)
|Rage in the Cage 140
|
|align=center|2
|align=center|1:12
|Chandler, Arizona, United States
|
|-
|Win
|align=center|3–0
| Evan Morton
|Decision (unanimous)
|Rage in the Cage 139
|
|align=center|3
|align=center|3:00
|Tucson, Arizona, United States
|
|-
|Win
|align=center|2–0
| Al Decastro
|TKO (punches)
|Rage in the Cage 138
|
|align=center|1
|align=center|1:15
|Mesa, Arizona, United States
|
|-
|Win
|align=center|1–0
| Sam Shapiro
|Decision (unanimous)
|Rage in the Cage 136
|
|align=center|3
|align=center|3:00
|Prescott Valley, Arizona, United States
|

Professional boxing record

See also
 List of current UFC fighters
 List of male mixed martial artists

References

External links

Official John Moraga Tee KO Page

1984 births
Living people
American male mixed martial artists
American mixed martial artists of Mexican descent
Sportspeople from Phoenix, Arizona
Flyweight mixed martial artists
Bantamweight mixed martial artists
Featherweight mixed martial artists
Mixed martial artists utilizing collegiate wrestling
Mixed martial artists utilizing freestyle wrestling
Mixed martial artists utilizing boxing
Mixed martial artists from Arizona
Arizona State Sun Devils wrestlers
Ultimate Fighting Championship male fighters